Oldman River Hydroelectric Plant is a run-of-river hydroelectric power station owned by  Atco Power (75%) and Piikani Nation (25%).  The plant is located on the Oldman River near in Pincher Creek, Alberta, Canada.  The plant is primarily used to supply power onto the Alberta grid.

Description
The plant consists of:
 Two horizontal axis Francis turbines, (VA Tech Bouvier Canada with GE generators).

See also

Oldman River Dam

References

Energy infrastructure completed in 2003
Hydroelectric power stations in Alberta
Run-of-the-river power stations